Claude Verret (born April 20, 1963) is a Canadian former professional ice hockey centre.  He was drafted in the eighth round, 163rd overall, by the Buffalo Sabres in the 1982 NHL Entry Draft.

Biography
Verret was born in Lachine, Quebec, but grew up in Quebec City, Quebec. As a youth, he played in the 1975 and 1976 Quebec International Pee-Wee Hockey Tournaments with a minor ice hockey team from Beauport, Quebec.

In the Quebec Major Junior Hockey League, he tallied 462 points in 200 games over three seasons with the Trois-Rivières Draveurs, winning the Jean Beliveau Trophy in 1981–82 as the league's leading scorer.  He scored another 183 points in 141 games during his first two seasons in the American Hockey League with the Sabres' farm club, the Rochester Americans, and won the Dudley "Red" Garrett Memorial Award in 1983–84 as the league's top rookie. 

Despite this success at the junior and minor league levels, Verret did not make much impact in the National Hockey League.  He played in just fourteen games with the Sabres, eleven in 1983–84 and three in 1984–85.  He scored two goals and added five assists.

Verret began playing in Europe in 1987, spending many seasons playing in France and Switzerland before retiring in 1999.

Awards
Michel Bergeron Trophy (QMJHL offensive rookie of the year): 1980–81
Frank J. Selke Memorial Trophy (QMJHL most sportsmanlike player): 1980–81 and 1981–82
Jean Beliveau Trophy (QMJHL leading scorer): 1981–82
Dudley "Red" Garrett Memorial Award (AHL rookie of the year): 1983–84

Career statistics

References

External links

1963 births
Living people
Buffalo Sabres draft picks
Buffalo Sabres players
Canadian ice hockey centres
Dragons de Rouen players
Genève-Servette HC players
EHC Kloten players
French Quebecers
Ice hockey people from Quebec City
Lausanne HC players
People from Lachine, Quebec
Rochester Americans players
Ice hockey people from Montreal
Trois-Rivières Draveurs players